Raffetto may refer to:

People

 Bertha Raffetto (1885-1952), American singer
 Isadeen Raffetto (1910-1987), wife of Alexander Howison Murray Jr.
 John Augustus Raffetto (1864-1954), American hotelier
 John Augustus Raffetto Jr. (1908-1977), American banker 
 Lloyd Raffetto (1897-1988), American banker 
 Michael Raffetto (1899-1990), American radio star

Places
 Raffetto, California